Newton Independent School District is a public school district based in Newton, Texas (USA).

In 2009, the school district was rated "academically acceptable" by the Texas Education Agency.

Schools
Newton High School (Grades 9-12)
Newton Middle (Grades 6-8)
Newton Elementary (Grades PK-5)

References

External links
Newton ISD

School districts in Newton County, Texas